Jean-Baptiste Léo (born 3 May 1996) is a French professional footballer who plays as a forward for Super League Greece club PAS Giannina.

Career

Sochaux
Léo's career started with Sochaux.

PAS Giannina
On 22 May 2018, PAS Giannina officially announced Léo's transfer from AO Chania Kissamikos, until the summer of 2021 for an undisclosed fee.
On 15 September 2018, he led PAS Giannina to their first three-point haul of the fledgling Super League season, as they defeated Apollon Smyrnis 2–1 at the Georgios Kamaras Stadium. With the club of Ioannina he won the Football League: 2019–20 and got promoted to the Super League Greece. He scored 10 goals and been the second top scorer together with the team mate Sandi Križman.

Riga
Léo transferred to Riga FC on 3 March 2021. On 10 June 2022, he was released by the club.

Return to PAS Giannina
On 26 July 2022, he signed again for PAS Giannina.

Career statistics

Club

Notes

Honours

PAS Giannina 
 Super League Greece 2: 2019–20

Individual 
 Top scorer Super League Greece 2 Runner- Up 2019–20 (10 goals)

References

External links 
 

1996 births
Living people
French footballers
French expatriate footballers
Association football forwards
Championnat National 2 players
Super League Greece players
Football League (Greece) players
Super League Greece 2 players
Latvian Higher League players
FC Sochaux-Montbéliard players
PAS Giannina F.C. players
Riga FC players
French expatriate sportspeople in Greece
French expatriate sportspeople in Latvia
Expatriate footballers in Greece
Expatriate footballers in Latvia
Footballers from Lyon